The year 1633 in music involved some significant events.

Events 
Heinrich Schütz travels to Denmark to be the interim choirmaster for King Christian IV.

Publications
Ignazio Donati – Second book of masses  for four and five voices, Op. 12 (Venice: Alessandro Vincenti)
Benedetto Ferrari – , volume 1, published in Venice
Melchior Franck –  for four voices (Coburg: Johann Forckel), a funeral motet
Francesco Pasquali – , Op. 6 (Orvieto: Giovanni Battista Robletti)

Classical music 
Antonio Maria Abbatini – , a dramatic cantata

Opera 
Michelangelo Rossi –  (first performed in Rome)

Births 
September 6 – Sebastian Knüpfer, German composer (died 1676)
date unknown – Jean-Nicolas Geoffroy, harpsichordist and organist (died 1694)

Deaths 
 August 12 – Jacopo Peri, Italian composer and singer (born 1561)
 October 24 – Jean Titelouze, French composer, poet and organist (born c. 1562/3)

References

 
Music
17th century in music
Music by year